Hanlan's Point Beach is a public beach situated on Hanlan's Point in the Toronto Islands near Toronto, Ontario on the shore of Lake Ontario. A 1 kilometre-long part of the beach was officially recognized by the city in 2002 as being clothing optional.

History

Hanlan's Point was a popular summer destination in the late nineteenth and early twentieth century. It featured a popular amusement park from the 1880s until the late 1920s, the Hanlan's Hotel, built by Edward Hanlan in 1880, and Hanlan's Point Stadium from 1897 until 1937. The hotel burned down in 1909 and was not replaced. The amusement park was unable to compete with the Sunnyside Amusement Park after it opened on the mainland in 1925, and closed in the late 1920s, and the stadium lost its main tenant, the Toronto Maple Leafs baseball team to Maple Leaf Stadium in 1926, and eventually closed in 1937.

Hanlan's Point became a popular meeting location for Toronto's gay community starting in the 1950s. The city's first Gay Pride celebration was held on the beach in 1971.

Hanlan's Point became a location for nude sunbathing. In 1999, Toronto City Council approved a one-year pilot project for a nude beach at Hanlan's Point following a proposal by naturist organization and Councillor Kyle Rae. In 2000, the council extended the project for another two years. Finally in 2002, the clothing-optional beach was made permanent.  

The Toronto City Council decision was met with strong opposition from conservative councillors such as Giorgio Mammoliti.  It was also an infrequent target of police crackdowns for nude sunbathing. Its official status has resulted in a distinct increase in ferry traffic, and it appears to be a profitable component of public- and private-sector advertising campaigns, since it draws visitors to Toronto.  Police and park officials now work in partnership with the beachgoers to maintain the friendly atmosphere. Some nudists have advocated to make the clothing optional side of Hanlan's  Point Beach a nude beach due to what they see as an excessive number of clothed people on the clothing optional side of the beach.

Background
Hanlan's Beach can be reached most directly by taking the Hanlan's Point ferry at the foot of Bay Street at Queens Quay. Aside from the cost of the ferry there is no admission fee. 

It is the second officially recognized clothing-optional beach in Canada and the only one created by a municipal bylaw. Canada's only other official clothing-optional beach is Wreck Beach in Vancouver, British Columbia.

The effective beach season starts in late May and ends in late September, while actual swimming off the beach is possible only well within this period. In recent years, the beach and islands as a whole have experienced flooding due to high water levels in the early summer.

As is common for most public nudist-friendly venues, males make up a large percentage of the users of the beach, but women can make up to one quarter of the total on popular weekends. Recent years continue to see an increase in the number of families who attend. The beach is a popular destination for the city's  gay community. The beach is also the regular site of day trips by several local nudist organizations. 

Despite its proximity to Toronto Harbour, the beach can boast extremely good water quality since it faces southwest and away from the mainland. Water quality is monitored daily (on weekdays) during the summer and meets a Blue Flag standard set by the Foundation for Environmental Education. 

The section of the beach closest to the Billy Bishop Toronto City Airport (YTZ) is also becoming a very popular spot for kiteboarding.

See also
List of social nudity places in North America
Federation of Canadian Naturists

Notes

External links

Official website

Beaches of Toronto
LGBT culture in Toronto
Nude beaches
Toronto Islands
1862 establishments in Canada